Monnickendam is a city in the Dutch province of North Holland. It received city rights in 1355 and was damaged by the fires of 1500 and 1513.

History

Monnikendam was also the name of a number of warships built at the port of the same name during the Anglo-Dutch Wars.

The town was founded by monks, the name Monnickendam translates as 'Monk's dam'.

Monnickendam was a separate municipality until 1991, when it was merged into Waterland. Although it is a small fishing village today, it was an important port in earlier centuries. It possesses a seventeenth-century weigh house, once used by merchants and port officials, and a bell tower that dates from 1591. The fourteenth century  church of St. Nicholas, renovated in 1602, is particularly notable. The synagogue was built in 1894.  Jewish families named Monnikendam trace their roots to this town.

The town was the site of an artist's colony in the early twentieth century.

Economy 
Monnickendam hosts a number of industries, many related to its history and proximity to the Markermeer. Notably, the city is home to the Royal Hakvoort Shipyards that has operated for over a century, first catering to the local fishing industry by building vessels for their purpose, and later moving into luxury and pleasure crafts.

Other notable organisations include Leguit + Roos, specialising in the renovation and restoration of historical buildings that are plenty in the Waterland area.

In recent developments, the derelict business quarter of Galgeriet was demolished in order to make space for the development of new residential buildings. The Dutch government has subsidised this development with € 6,420,240, with the hope of creating 700 homes as well as additional commercial spaces to both alleviate the ailing demography and provide an impetus for further economic growth.

Demographics
In 2001, the town of Monnickendam had 9,546 inhabitants. The wider statistical area of Monnickendam has a population of around 9,680.

Notable people
 Wendelmoet Claesdochter, first female martyr during the Reformation, killed in a 1527 in The Hague
 Cornelis Dirkszoon, mayor of Monnickendam during the Eighty Years' War
 Hermann Jung (1608–1678), prominent Lutheran theologian and preacher
 Simon Lambrechtszoon Mau, captain of the Duyfken who led the first expedition to the Dutch East Indies using a route around Africa
 Marlou van Rhijn, two-time 200 metre gold medal winner at the 2012 and 2016 Paralymics

Gallery

See also
Museum de Speeltoren

References

External links

 
Cities in the Netherlands
Former municipalities of North Holland
Populated places in North Holland
Waterland